Veal Oscar is a culinary creation served for the first time on September 18, 1897, and said to have been named in honor of Sweden's King Oscar II, who was especially partial to its ingredients.  The dish consists of sauteed veal cutlets topped with crab (or occasionally lobster) meat, and an emulsified butter sauce such as Hollandaise or Béarnaise.   Traditionally Veal Oscar is garnished with 2 white asparagus spears. In modern times, the dish is often made with steak.

See also
 List of veal dishes

References 

Veal dishes